The First Harrison Gray Otis House is a historic house museum and National Historic Landmark at 141 Cambridge Street in the West End of Boston, Massachusetts. The house, built in 1795–96, was the first of three houses designed by Charles Bulfinch and built for Massachusetts politician Harrison Gray Otis. It is notable as one of the earliest three-story brick houses that came to represent the Federal style of architecture, and its interiors show the influence of Robert Adam. The house is now the headquarters of Historic New England, a regional preservation organization, and is open year-round for tours.

Description and history
The house is the simplest of the three designed by Bulfinch for Otis. The design is said to be inspired by a William Bingham house that Bulfinch saw in 1789 in Philadelphia, which was in turned derived from a house in London. The house is three stories tall, five bays wide, with elegant string courses. Today's graceful entrance was added after 1801. Above it is a fine Palladian window, and above that a lunette. The third floor is very short; ceilings are just over 6 feet tall.  The floor plan follows a typical central hall plan, with two rooms on either side of the central hallway. The kitchen was in an ell.

The house was purchased in 1916 by the Society for the Preservation of New England Antiquities (now Historic New England) for use as its headquarters.  It was originally located about 40 feet forward of its present location, but was moved in the 1920s after it was threatened by the widening of Cambridge Street. The original cellar was lost during this move. The house is now connected to a group of row houses on Lynde Street, which serve as office and program space for Historic New England.  The house underwent a careful restoration in 1960, overseen by Abbott Lowell Cummings.  It is open year-round for tours.

See also
List of National Historic Landmarks in Boston
National Register of Historic Places listings in northern Boston, Massachusetts

References

External links
Historic New England: Otis House Museum, 1796

Houses completed in 1796
Museums in Boston
Historic house museums in Massachusetts
Charles Bulfinch buildings
Houses in Boston
Federal architecture in Massachusetts
Georgian architecture in Massachusetts
National Historic Landmarks in Boston
Historic New England
Individually listed contributing properties to historic districts on the National Register in Massachusetts
Houses on the National Register of Historic Places in Suffolk County, Massachusetts
National Register of Historic Places in Boston
1796 establishments in Massachusetts